The Confederate Soldiers Monument, also known as the Confederate Dead Monument, is a Confederate memorial installed outside the Texas State Capitol, in Austin, Texas. The monument was erected in 1903, as part of an effort to "romanticize the motivations that drew Texas into the [U.S.] Civil War." Its sculpture was designed by Pompeo Coppini, and its base was designed by Frank Teich.  The sculpture was cast by Roman Bronze Works (New York City).

The monument consists of four bronze figures on the base that represent the Confederate Military: Infantry, Cavalry, Artillery and Navy. At the top of the monument standing far above the other figures is Jefferson Davis, the President of the Confederate States.

Inscription

Historical Inaccuracies
The listed size of the Confederate (600,000) and Union (2,859,132) forces is incorrect and greatly exaggerates the advantage held by the Union Military.  

The Texas Declaration Of Causes (1861) does not use the phrase “states rights”, but repeatedly cites opposition to the United States' desire to end the enslavement of Black Americans or grant them legal rights. The only explicit reference to the U.S. Constitution is to the Fugitive Slave Clause.

See also

 1903 in art
 Lost Cause of the Confederacy
 List of Confederate monuments and memorials

References

External links
 

1903 establishments in Texas
1903 sculptures
Confederate States of America monuments and memorials in Texas
Statues of Jefferson Davis
Outdoor sculptures in Austin, Texas
Sculptures by Pompeo Coppini
Sculptures of men in Texas
Statues in Austin, Texas